Annemie Wolff, also known as Annemie Wolff-Koller, born as Anna Maria Koller (27 December 1906 Laufen an der Salzach - 2 February 1994 Amsterdam), was a German-Dutch photographer. Her 1943 photos of Jewish and non-Jewish children and adults, taken in Amsterdam, were rediscovered in 2008 by Dutch photo historian Simon Kool. About 3000 photos were taken of 440 persons, and about 300 of the subjects have been identified in November 2016. About 50% of the photos' Jewish subjects perished in the Nazi concentration camps, while the others survived World War II.

An exhibit of Wolff's photos opened on 26 February 2015 at the San Francisco Goethe Institute, co-sponsored by the Annemie and Helmuth Foundation, and the San Francisco Jewish Community Federation.

Biography

In 1933, Annemie Wolff and her husband, Jewish architect Helmuth Wolff, left Munich, Germany, and moved to Amsterdam.

They opened a photography studio in the "Rivierenbuurt", an area of south Amsterdam where many German refugees settled. They founded photography magazine Kleinbeeldfoto, released several international photo stories and in 1939 organized an exhibit with pictures taken by subscribers to the magazine. Prince Bernhard was among the subscribers, presenting pictures of baby Princess Beatrix, later Queen of the Netherlands. Their main photography assignments came from the Amsterdam Port Authority and Schiphol Airport.

In May 1940, upon the Nazi invasion of the Netherlands, they attempted to carry out a suicide pact; Helmuth died but Annemie survived. In 1943, she continued her portrait work in her studio. After the war she produced publicity photographs for the Amsterdam harbor and other clients. Later research by Dutch photo historian Simon Kool revealed that Annemie was a member of the Dutch resistance group 'De ondergedoken Camera'.

In her later years, however, she rarely spoke about her work during the war period.

References

External links
Annemie and Helmuth Wolff Foundation website
Lost Stories, Found Images exhibit info at SF Jewish Community Federation and Endowment Fund
Netherland-America Foundation San Francisco Chapter

1906 births
1994 deaths
Dutch women photographers
Resistance members from Amsterdam
People from Berchtesgadener Land
Photographers from Amsterdam
20th-century Dutch photographers
20th-century women photographers
20th-century Dutch women
German emigrants to the Netherlands